Shiptonthorpe is a village and civil parish in the East Riding of Yorkshire, England.

According to the 2011 UK census, Shiptonthorpe parish had a population of 503, an increase on the 2001 UK census figure of 419.

In Shiptonthorpe there is a petrol station, two Churches, a shop, and a Renault main dealer. Two pubs that were in the village have now closed. The parish church of All Saints is a Grade I listed building. On the outskirts of the village there is a garden centre called Langlands, and a McDonald's (formerly a Little Chef) which opened in 2014.

The A1079 road runs through part of the village. Plans for a bypass of the village were put forward in the 1989 Roads for Prosperity white paper but were subsequently dropped.

Shiptonthorpe was served by Londesborough railway station on the York to Beverley Line between 1847 and 1965.

References

External links

Villages in the East Riding of Yorkshire
Civil parishes in the East Riding of Yorkshire